Quarry Hill is an inner suburb of Bendigo, Victoria, Australia  south of the Bendigo city centre.

History

According to the Victorian Places web site
 The area was first known as Charcoal Gully, where an Anglican school was opened in 1857. In 1873 it was replaced with a State school known as Sandhurst East, a name which lasted until 1908 when it was named Quarry Hill.
The locality is generally hilly and hardly disfigured by mine or quarry workings. In fact, the hills serve as a visual backdrop to several fine Victorian and Edwardian houses, the most notable of which is The Eyrie (1874) at 18 Reginald Street. A short distance to the south is the Bendigo Cemetery (1858). Both The Eyrie and the cemetery are on the Victorian Heritage Register, including the cemetery's chapel and funerary oven.
Another house is Edelweiss in Hamlet Street. It was built in 1890 for Sir John Quick, constitutional lawyer and Bendigo parliamentarian. In retirement, Quick served on the committees of the Bendigo art gallery and mechanics' institute, wrote pioneering bibliographical studies and was instrumental in founding the Quarry Hill golf club.

Facilities

Quarry Hill Community Hall is in Hamlet Street, Quarry Hill.

Quarry Hill Recreation Reserve

St. Joseph's Catholic Primary School is in Gladstone Street, Quarry Hill, in the parish of St. Joseph, Quarry Hill. Archbishop Carr laid the foundation stone on 29 August 1906. The school opened for classes on 30 April 1907.  Children attend from the suburbs of Quarry Hill and Spring Gully, as well as the outer suburbs such as White Hills and Epsom.

Quarry Hill Primary School in Peel Street opened in 1911.
Quarry Hill Golf Club is at 47-85 Houston St, Quarry Hill.

References

External links
 Map of the streets of Quarry Hill

Gallery

Bendigo
Suburbs of Bendigo
Towns in Victoria (Australia)
Mining towns in Victoria (Australia)